Sagarkan (also Romanized as Segerkan) is a village in Gafr and Parmon Rural District, Gafr and Parmon District, Bashagard County, Hormozgan Province, Iran. At the 2006 census, its population was 201, in 52 families.

References 

Populated places in Bashagard County